Mihran Tsarukyan  (born September 22, 1987), is an Armenian singer and actor. His debut music video was released in 2011. He is known for his roles as Arsen on Full House, and Gor on the Armenian TV series Hard Life.

Career

2006-2007: Hay Superstar
In 2006, Tsarukyan became a contestant in season 2 of Hay Superstar, the Armenian version of Pop Idol. In the contest, he placed third and was disqualified on July 23.

Personal life
In December 2019, Tsarukyan married presenter and actress Arpi Gabrielyan, who was his playmate in Full House. In July 2020, their son Robert was born.

Filmography

Discography

Singles and songs

Awards and nominations

References

External links 

21st-century Armenian male actors
Armenian male film actors
1987 births
Living people
Male actors from Yerevan
Musicians from Yerevan
21st-century Armenian male singers
Armenian pop singers
Armenian folk-pop singers
Hay Superstar participants